

Bela Marsh (1797-1869) was a publisher and bookseller in Boston, Massachusetts, in the 19th century. Authors under his imprint included spiritualists and abolitionists such as John Stowell Adams, Adin Ballou, Warren Chase, Lysander Spooner, and Henry Clarke Wright. Marsh kept offices on Washington Street (ca.1820-1832), Cornhill (ca.1847-1852), Franklin Street (ca.1854-1856), and Bromfield Street (ca.1858-1868). Among his business partners were Nahum Capen, Gardner P. Lyon, T.H. Webb, and George W. Williams. He belonged to the Massachusetts Charitable Mechanic Association and the Physiological Society.

Marsh was the defendant in the seminal copyright case, Folsom v. Marsh (C.C.D. Mass. 1841), for publishing a two-volume abridgment of George Washington's letters, where the Justice Joseph Story found he had infringed the copyright in the 12-volume set of the same edited by Jared Sparks.

References

External links
 WorldCat. Marsh, Bela 1797-1869
 Open Library. Bela Marsh, publisher
 Library of Congress. Position of the Democratic Party in 1852. "Freemen of America, how long will you be ledd by such leaders" (item sold by Marsh)

1797 births
1869 deaths
Businesspeople from Boston
19th century in Boston
Abolitionism in the United States
Spiritualism
American publishers (people)
19th-century American businesspeople